Nemesvita is a village in Veszprém county, Hungary. The village is located about 2 km north of Lake Balaton.

External links 
 Street map (Hungarian)

Populated places in Veszprém County